Bera Bera Rugby Taldea is a Spanish rugby union club. The club was established in 1983 and currently competes in the División de Honor B de Rugby competition, the second-level of Spanish club rugby. The club are based in Donostia-San Sebastian. Bera Bera play in blue and orange.

Trophies
Copa del Rey: 1
Champions: 2003–04
Supercopa de España: 0
Runners-up: 2004

Season by season

12 seasons in División de Honor

International honours
 Pedro J Dávila
 Iker Lopategi
 David Hernández
 Oscar Astarloa
 Igor Mirones
 Gorka Bueno
 Pablo Feijoo

Other notable players
 Javier Arbelaiz plays the Challenge Cup with Olympus Madrid
 James Foster signs from Tasman (NPC)
 Daniel Larrechea sings from Aviron Bayonnais (Top14), former player from Sale Sharks, international France A.
 Tama Makamaka international All-Blacks U20
 Bruno Hiriart signs from US Dax (Top14)

Ground

External links
Official website
Spanish Rugby website

Rugby union teams in the Basque Country (autonomous community)
Rugby clubs established in 1983
Multi-sport clubs in Spain
Sports teams in San Sebastián
1983 establishments in Spain